Niall Quinn (born 1966), is an Irish former footballer and businessman.

Niall Quinn may also refer to:

Niall Quinn (racing driver)
Niall Quinn (born 1973), Irish musician, original singer of The Cranberries and drummer of The Hitchers